Tunisia competed at the 2013 World Aquatics Championships in Barcelona, Spain between 20 July and 4 August 2013.

Medalists

Open water swimming

Tunisia nominated five athletes (four men and one woman) to participate.

Swimming

Tunisian swimmers earned qualifying standards in the following events (up to a maximum of two swimmers in each event at the A-standard entry time, and one at the B-standard):

Men

References

External links
 Barcelona 2013 official site
 FTN (Federation Tunisienne de Natation) 

Nations at the 2013 World Aquatics Championships
2013
World Aquatics Championships